Fox Sports News is an Australian cable and satellite sports news channel, owned by Fox Sports Pty Limited (formerly Premier Media Group) and is the sister channel of Fox Sports.

Fox Sports News launched on 1 October 2006. Initially, for 6 hours a day (midnight6am AEST) the channel would simulcast Sky Sports News, similar to the set-up of Australian News channel Sky News Australia. It was later replaced by a continuous loop of different newscasts broadcast that day.

On 5 March 2013 at Fox Sports new headquarters launch in Artarmon, New South Wales, among the announcements relating to Fox Sports was the new logo of Fox Sports and Fox Sports News which is in line with its global affiliate broadcasters.

On 3 November 2014, Fox Sports News launched a HD simulcast. In addition, it moved from channel 513 to channel 500.

Fox Sports News is available at the Fox Sports website free of charge. However, its live stream is only accessible in Australia.

The live programming has always been varied since the channel's launch. It was originally live from 6am - midnight, then 6am - 1am, and 5am - 1am. It currently runs live programming from 5:30 am to 12:30 am.

Presenters 
Megan Barnard
Jim Callinan
Sophie Clapin
Catherine Durkin
Joanna Healy
Scott Jackson
Isabella Leembruggen
Kath Loughnan
Lara Pitt
Yvonne Sampson
Alissa Smith
Julie Snook
Eloise Sohier
Sam Squires
Matt Suleau

Former Presenters 
Luke Doherty (now News Editor, Fox Sports News Australia)
Lee Furlong
Steve Hart
Christian Jantzen
Glen Lauder
Melanie McLaughlin
Gerard Middleton
Heather Miller
Leith Mulligan
David Murdoch
Ryan Phelan
Dean Potter
Louise Ransome
Matt Shirvington
Alana Smith
Chris Stubbs
Chris Warren
Tom Wilson

Reporters 
Catherine Durkin (NSW)
Drew Jones (VIC)
Charmaine Mifsud
Sarah Olle (Fox Footy)
Cody Kaye (NSW)
Geoff Smith (NSW)

Programs

Rolling news coverage
 Sports First (Daily 5:30 – 9:00 am)
 Sports Nation (Weekdays 9:00 am & 6:00 pm)
 Sportsday (Weekdays 10:00 am – 6:00 pm)
 Sportsnight (Weekdays 7:00 pm – 10:00 pm)
 Gameday Live (Weekends 9:00 – 10:30 am)
 Sports Saturday (Saturday 10:30 am – 10:00 pm)
 Sports Sunday (Sunday 10:30 am – 6:00 pm)
 Fulltime Live (Thursday-Saturday 10:00 pm – 12:00 am, Sunday 6:00 pm – 9:00 pm)
 Extra Time (Sunday-Wednesday 10:00 pm – 12:30 am, Friday-Sunday 12:00 am – 12:30 am)

Specialty
 The Serve - Monday to Thursday, 6pm – 6:30pm
 Fox Sports Tonight - Monday to Thursday, 7pm – 8pm.
 The Early Lead - Weeknights, 11pm – 11:30pm with Dan Ginnane.

Seasonal:
 Cricket AM - 9:30am – 10am hosted by Jim Callinan. 
 AFL tonight - Weeknights, 5pm – 5:30pm
 NRL tonight - Weeknights, 5:30pm – 6pm

Former programs 

 Morning Rush
 Morning News
 FOX Sports News HQ
 FOX Sports News Express 
 Peak Hour
 FOX Sports News Overnight
 Sports Bite
 FOX Sports News Bet
 Long Lunch
 FOX Sports News
 FOX Sports News & Views
 Full Time
 The Back Page

See also 

Fox Sports Australia
Sky News Australia

References

24-hour television news channels in Australia
English-language television stations in Australia
Television channels and stations established in 2006
Fox Sports (Australian TV network)
Sports television networks in Australia